Westall may refer to;

People
Richard Westall (1765–1836), English painter
Robert Westall (1929–1993), English writer 
Walter W. Westall (1880–1968), New York politician
Wilfrid Westall, English bishop
William Westall (1781–1850), English landscape artist 
William Bury Westall (1834–1903), English novelist

 Cecily Westall Rymill (1939–1991)
 Richard Westall Rogers Jr. (born 1950), U.S. serial killer

Places
Westall, Clayton South, Victoria, Australia
Westall railway station, Melbourne, Australia
Westall Road, Australian road 
Mount Westall (Queensland), Australian mountain

Other
Westall UFO, Australian UFO siting

See also